Veli Pasha Mosque can refer to:
 Veli Pasha Mosque (Ioannina), an Ottoman mosque in Ioannina, Greece.
 Veli Pasha Mosque (Rethymno), an Ottoman mosque in Rethymno, Greece.